Rhea County Department of Education, also known as Rhea County Schools or Rhea School District, is a school district headquartered in Dayton, Tennessee. It serves students in the county, except for the City of Dayton, for elementary and middle school, as well as high school students throughout the entire county.

Schools
Secondary schools:
 Rhea County High School  - Evensville (Unincorporated area)
 Rhea County Middle School - Evensville
 Spring City Middle School - Spring City

Elementary schools:
 Frazier Elementary School - Unincorporated area near Dayton
 Graysville Elementary School - Graysville
 Rhea Central Elementary School - Unincorporated area near Dayton
 Spring City Elementary School - Spring City

See also
 Dayton City School - The municipal school district and school for the City of Dayton, covering elementary and middle school

References

External links
 Rhea County Department of Education
School districts in Tennessee
Education in Rhea County, Tennessee